The International Wheelset Congress (IWC) was founded by Lucchini in 1963. The first congress took place in Bergamo, Italy, in that year. Since then, with only two exceptions it has been held every third year. The International Wheelset Congress is the oldest railway technical conference in the world.

One of the premier international rail conferences, The International Wheelset Congress, attracts engineers from the international rail community. The congress provides a platform for rail operators, equipment builders, component suppliers, academia and government, regulatory and standards organisations. It is also a forum for dissemination of technology and advancements in the design and manufacture of rail wheelset components and their performance to promote increased productivity, performance and safety in rail operations.

Recent meetings
The 15th International Wheelset Congress was held in Prague, Czech Republic, in September 2007. The location of the congress is chosen worldwide according to a rotational rule.

The 16th International Wheelset Congress was held at the Cape Town International Convention Centre in Cape Town, South Africa, in March 2010. The event was hosted by Ringrollers Pty Ltd under the auspices of Union des Industries Ferroviaires Européennes (UNIFE) and ERWA.

The 17th International Wheelset Congress was held in Ukraine in 2013 and was hosted by KLW-WheelCo. The main topic of the conference - new technologies increasing the operational life cycle of the wheelsets.

The 19th International Wheelset Congress was held in Venice, Italy in 2019. It was hosted by Lucchini RS. The main topic of the conference was: "Wheelset of the future: an Integrated System". The congress was held from June 16 to 20 at the Fondazione Giorgio Cini, on San Giorgio Island.

Congress History 

1963 - Bergamo, Italy
1966 - Munich, Germany 
1969 - Sheffield, England 
1972 - Paris, France 
1975 - Tokyo, Japan 
1978 - Colorado Springs, USA 
1981 - Vienna, Austria 
1984 - Madrid, Spain 
1988 - Montreal, Canada 
1992 - Sydney, Australia 
1995 - Paris, France 
1998 - Qingdao, China 
2001 - Rome, Italy 
2004 - Orlando, USA 
2007 - Prague, Czech Republic
2010 - Cape Town, South Africa
2013 - Kiev, Ukraine
2016 - Chengdu, China
2019 - Venice, Italy

References

External links
 Ringrollers (Pty) Ltd
 UNIFE: European Rail Industry
 Cape Town International Convention Centre
 Lucchini Group
 KLW

International rail transport organizations
Trade fairs
Rail industry
Railway associations